Duncan Stewart may refer to:
 Duncan Stewart (Mississippi politician) (1761–1820), lieutenant governor of Mississippi, 1817–1820
 Duncan Stewart (Uruguayan politician) (1833–1923), interim president of Uruguay in 1894
 Duncan Stewart (colonial administrator) (1904–1949), British governor of Sarawak assassinated by Rosli Dhobie in 1949
 Duncan Stewart of Ardsheal (1732–1793)
 Duncan Alexander Stewart (1850–1936), Scottish-born farmer and political figure in Manitoba, Canada
 Duncan Stewart, cardiologist and CEO of the Ottawa Health Research Institute
 Duncan Stewart (Home and Away), character in the Australian television series Home and Away
 Duncan Stewart (footballer, born 1860) (fl. 1884–1892), Scottish footballer (Dumbarton FC and Scotland)
 Duncan Stewart (footballer, born 1900) (1900–?), Scottish footballer for Sunderland
 Duncan Stewart (golfer) (born 1984), Scottish golfer
 Duncan Stewart (environmentalist) (born 1948), Irish television presenter
 Duncan Stewart (academic) (1930–1996), British academic administrator

See also